The Bandayevsky RB-12 (Cyrillic: Ружьё Бандаевского РБ-12 – Ruzh'yo Bandayevskogo RB-12) is a shotgun of Russian origin. The weapon is a slide-action (pumped forward) shotgun and comes with a folding stock.  The gun is designed by Aleksandr Bandayevsky, chief designer and president of JSC Uralmashproekt.

See also
List of Russian weaponry
List of shotguns

References

Pump-action shotguns
Shotguns of Russia